The Europe/Africa Zone was one of the three zones of the regional Davis Cup competition in 2000.

In the Europe/Africa Zone there were four different tiers, called groups, in which teams competed against each other to advance to the upper tier. The top two teams in Group III advanced to the Europe/Africa Zone Group II in 2001, whereas the bottom two teams were relegated to the Europe/Africa Zone Group IV in 2001.

Participating nations

Draw
 Venue: Association Culturelle et Sportive d'Ambohidahy, Antananarivo, Madagascar
 Date: 24–28 May

Group A

Group B

1st to 4th place play-offs

5th to 8th place play-offs

Final standings

  and  promoted to Group II in 2001.
  and  relegated to Group IV in 2001.

Round robin

Group A

Moldova vs. Senegal

Iceland vs. Benin

Moldova vs. Iceland

Senegal vs. Benin

Moldova vs. Benin

Iceland vs. Senegal

Group B

Armenia vs. Madagascar

Macedonia vs. Nigeria

Armenia vs. Macedonia

Madagascar vs. Nigeria

Armenia vs. Nigeria

Macedonia vs. Madagascar

1st to 4th place play-offs

Semifinals

Iceland vs. Armenia

Moldova vs. Macedonia

Final

Moldova vs. Armenia

3rd to 4th play-off

Iceland vs. Macedonia

5th to 8th place play-offs

5th to 8th play-offs

Senegal vs. Nigeria

Benin vs. Madagascar

5th to 6th play-off

Nigeria vs. Madagascar

7th to 8th play-off

Senegal vs. Benin

References

External links
Davis Cup official website

Davis Cup Europe/Africa Zone
Europe Africa Zone Group III